Ernst Sigmund Goldner (July 13, 1921 – March 17, 1999), known professionally as Ernest Gold, was an Austrian-born American composer. He is most noted for his work on the film Exodus produced in 1960.

Early life
Gold was born in 1921 in Vienna, the son of Elisabeth (Stransky) and Gustav Goldner. Gold came from a musical family. His father played the violin, and his mother sang. His father also studied under Richard Heuberger. Gold said that he learned to read music before he had learned to read words. He studied the violin and the piano when he was six years old and began composing music at eight. By age 13, he had written an entire opera. As a child, he said he wanted to go to Hollywood and be a composer. Gold would go to movie theaters as a teenager not only to watch the films but also to listen to the musical score. Among prominent film composers of the time he admired Max Steiner. In 1938, Gold attended the Viennese Akademie für Musik und darstellende Kunst, but he moved to the U.S. after the Anschluss of Austria, because of the family's Jewish heritage. In the United States, Gold earned money by working as an accompanist and writing popular songs in New York City. He also studied with Otto Cesana and Léon Barzin at the National Orchestra Association.

Career
NBC Orchestra performed Gold's first symphony in 1939, only a year after he moved to the United States. In 1941, he composed a symphony that was later played at Carnegie Hall in 1945. Gold moved to Hollywood in the same year to work with Columbia Pictures, his first significant role being the score for the melodrama Girl of the Limberlost (1945). After this opportunity, Gold wrote scores for other minor films. For the next ten years, he continued to work on B movies, mainly orchestrating and arranging music for western movies and melodramas.

He was asked by Stanley Kramer to orchestrate Not as a Stranger (1955).  The music for the film was written by George Antheil.  This production opened the door for Gold to work with other scores written by Antheil and to orchestrate more of Kramer's films.  Gold worked on almost every film Kramer made, including A Child Is Waiting and It's a Mad, Mad, Mad, Mad World.

Gold produced his first original film score in 1958 for Too Much, Too Soon.  His big break came in 1959, when he was asked to score On the Beach after Antheil became ill and he recommended Gold for the job.

Gold is most widely recognized for composing the score of Exodus (1960).  He was contracted by Otto Preminger and, atypically, was able to watch the filming of the movie.  Gold spent time in Israel to write the score.

In 1968, Gold wrote a Broadway musical called I'm Solomon.  He also wrote music for television.  In his later life, Gold was the musical director of the Santa Barbara Symphony Orchestra.  He also founded the Los Angeles Senior Citizens Orchestra.

His concert works include a piano concerto, a string quartet, and a piano sonata. Ernest Gold's "Fight for Survival" from Exodus was sampled by Moby in his song Porcelain.

Awards
Gold's contributions were recognized with Academy Award nominations and Golden Globe nominations. He won a Golden Globe in 1960 for Best Motion Picture Score for 1959's On the Beach. This film was also nominated for an Academy Award for Best Scoring of a Dramatic or Comedy Picture that same year. In 1960, Gold's Exodus was nominated for a Golden Globe in the Best Original Score category. The film won an Academy Award for Best Best Scoring of a Dramatic or Comedy Picture and a Grammy for Best Soundtrack Album. For his contributions, Gold had his name engraved in the Hollywood Walk of Fame. He was the first composer to receive this honor.

Personal life
Gold was married to singer and actress Marni Nixon from 1950 to 1969. They had three children: musician Andrew Gold (composer of "Lonely Boy" and "Thank You for Being a Friend"), Martha Carr, and Melani Gold. Gold's marriage after Nixon was to Jan Keller Gold (from 1975 until his death).

Ernest Gold died on March 17, 1999, in Santa Monica, California, at the age of 77 from complications following a stroke.

Selected filmography

References

External links 
 
 
 Ernest Gold papers, MSS 2196 at the L. Tom Perry Special Collections Library, Harold B. Lee Library, Brigham Young University

1921 births
1999 deaths
20th-century American composers
20th-century classical composers
American classical composers
American film score composers
American male classical composers
American musical theatre composers
Austrian classical composers
Jewish emigrants from Austria to the United States after the Anschluss
Austrian film score composers
Austrian male classical composers
Best Original Music Score Academy Award winners
Golden Globe Award-winning musicians
Grammy Award winners
Jewish emigrants from Nazi Germany to the United States
American male film score composers
Musicians from Vienna
20th-century American male musicians